Fabio Livio Morelli (born 14 March 1995) is a Swiss footballer who plays for Biel-Bienne.

Career
Morelli spent seven seasons with the Neuchâtel Xamax youth academy before joining the Montreal Impact Academy from 2013 to 2015.  On 13 March 2015, it was announced that Morelli would join FC Montreal, a USL affiliate club of the Montreal Impact for their inaugural season.  He made his professional debut for the club on 28 March in a 2–0 defeat to Toronto FC II.

In February 2022, Morelli moved to Biel-Bienne on loan. In July 2022, the transfer was made permanent.

References

External links
USSF Development Academy bio

1995 births
People from Neuchâtel
Sportspeople from the canton of Neuchâtel
Living people
Swiss men's footballers
Association football forwards
FC Montreal players
SC Young Fellows Juventus players
FC Köniz players
Yverdon-Sport FC players
FC Biel-Bienne players
USL Championship players
Swiss Promotion League players
2. Liga Interregional players
Swiss expatriate footballers
Expatriate soccer players in Canada
Swiss expatriate sportspeople in Canada